Rescuers: Stories of Courage: Two Women is a 1997 television film directed by Peter Bogdanovich. It was executive produced by Barbra Streisand.

Plot
Two women try to save Jews from the Germans in World War Two. The story is told in two segments.

In "Mamusha" a Polish housekeeper Gertruda (Elizabeth Perkins) for a Jewish family who helps the mother and her 3-year-old boy flee Warsaw to safety. She then takes the boy to Palestine.

In "Woman on a Bicycle," a secretary (Sela Ward) at a Catholic Diocese in France helps protect a Jewish family.

Cast
Elizabeth Perkins
Sela Ward

References

External links

Review at Los Angeles Times
Review at Entertainment Weekly
Film page at TCMDB

Films directed by Peter Bogdanovich
Films scored by Hummie Mann
1997 films